Kaduna South is a Local Government Area in Kaduna Central Kaduna State, Nigeria. Its headquarters is the town of Makera. Other wards are Barnawa, Tudun wada, Television, Kakuri, Unguwar Muazu, Kabala West, Sabon Gari, Badikko, Unguwar Sanusi and Kurmin Mashi. It has an area of 46.2 km2. The postal code of the area is 800.

Boundaries
Kaduna South Local Government Area shares boundaries with three Local Government Areas: Kaduna North Local Government Area to the north, Chikun Local Government Area to the south and Igabi Local Government Area to the northwest, respectively.

Administrative subdivisions
Kaduna South Local Government Area consists of 13 subdivisions (second-order administrative divisions), namely:
 Badiko
 Barnawa
 Kakuri Gwari
 Kakuri Hausa
 Makera
 Sabon Gari North
 Sabon Gari South
 Television
 Tudun Nupawa
 Tudun Wada North
 Tudun Wada South
 Tudun Wada West
 Unguwan Sanusi

Demographics
It has an area of 46.2 km2 and a population of 402,731 at the 2006 census.

People
The area has a mixed population, comprising Nigerian ethnic groups amongst which include: Adara, Atyap, Bajju, Gbagyi, Ham, Hausa, Idoma, Igala, Igbo and Yoruba, amongst others, practicing different religions.

See also 
 Kaduna
 Southern Kaduna

References

Local Government Areas in Kaduna State